Stupid, But Brave is a 1924 American silent comedy short film directed by Roscoe Arbuckle.

Cast
 Al St. John as The Bum
 Doris Deane as The Peeling Daughter
 Eugene Pallette as Richard Peeling - Banana King
 Kewpie Morgan as The Barber
 Clem Beauchamp as Minor Role (uncredited)
 George Davis as A Bum (uncredited)

See also
 Fatty Arbuckle filmography

References

External links

1924 films
1924 comedy films
1924 short films
Films directed by Roscoe Arbuckle
American silent short films
American black-and-white films
Silent American comedy films
American comedy short films
1920s American films